In mathematics and computer science, connectivity is one of the basic concepts of graph theory: it asks for the minimum number of elements (nodes or edges) that need to be removed to separate the remaining nodes into two or more isolated subgraphs. It is closely related to the theory of network flow problems. The connectivity of a graph is an important measure of its resilience as a network.

Connected vertices and graphs 

Otherwise, they are called disconnected. If the two vertices are additionally connected by a path of length , i.e. by a single edge, the vertices are called adjacent.

A graph is said to be connected if every pair of vertices in the graph is connected. This means that there is a path between every pair of vertices. An undirected graph that is not connected is called disconnected. An undirected graph G is therefore disconnected if there exist two vertices in G such that no path in G has these vertices as endpoints. A graph with just one vertex is connected. An edgeless graph with two or more vertices is disconnected.

A directed graph is called weakly connected if replacing all of its directed edges with undirected edges produces a connected (undirected) graph.

Components and cuts 
A connected component is a maximal connected subgraph of an undirected graph. Each vertex belongs to exactly one connected component, as does each edge. A graph is connected if and only if it has exactly one connected component.

The strong components are the maximal strongly connected subgraphs of a directed graph.

A vertex cut or separating set of a connected graph  is a set of vertices whose removal renders  disconnected. The vertex connectivity  (where  is not a complete graph) is the size of a minimal vertex cut.

In particular, a complete graph with  vertices, denoted , has no vertex cuts at all, but .

Local connectivity is symmetric for undirected graphs; that is, .

-connectivity is also called biconnectivity and -connectivity is also called triconnectivity. A graph  which is connected but not -connected is sometimes called separable.

Analogous concepts can be defined for edges. In the simple case in which cutting a single, specific edge would disconnect the graph, that edge is called a bridge. Again, local edge-connectivity is symmetric.

A graph is said to be maximally connected if its connectivity equals its minimum degree. A graph is said to be maximally edge-connected if its edge-connectivity equals its minimum degree.

Super- and hyper-connectivity 
A graph is said to be super-connected or super-κ if every minimum vertex cut isolates a vertex. A graph is said to be hyper-connected or hyper-κ if the deletion of each minimum vertex cut creates exactly two components, one of which is an isolated vertex. A graph is semi-hyper-connected or semi-hyper-κ if any minimum vertex cut separates the graph into exactly two components.

More precisely: a  connected graph is said to be super-connected or super-κ if all minimum vertex-cuts consist of the vertices adjacent with one (minimum-degree) vertex.
A  connected graph is said to be super-edge-connected or super-λ if all minimum edge-cuts consist of the edges incident on some (minimum-degree) vertex.

Then the superconnectivity κ1 of G is:
 κ1(G) = min{|X| : X is a non-trivial cutset}.

A non-trivial edge-cut and the edge-superconnectivity λ1(G) are defined analogously.

Menger's theorem 

One of the most important facts about connectivity in graphs is Menger's theorem, which characterizes the connectivity and edge-connectivity of a graph in terms of the number of independent paths between vertices.

Similarly, the collection is edge-independent if no two paths in it share an edge.

Menger's theorem asserts that for distinct vertices u,v,  equals , and if u is also not adjacent to v then  equals .  This fact is actually a special case of the max-flow min-cut theorem.

Computational aspects 
The problem of determining whether two vertices in a graph are connected can be solved efficiently using a search algorithm, such as breadth-first search.  More generally, it is easy to determine computationally whether a graph is connected (for example, by using a disjoint-set data structure), or to count the number of connected components. A simple algorithm might be written in pseudo-code as follows:

Begin at any arbitrary node of the graph, 
Proceed from that node using either depth-first or breadth-first search, counting all nodes reached.

In computational complexity theory, SL is the class of problems log-space reducible to the problem of determining whether two vertices in a graph are connected, which was proved to be equal to L by Omer Reingold in 2004. Hence, undirected graph connectivity may be solved in  space.

The problem of computing the probability that a Bernoulli random graph is connected is called network reliability and the problem of computing whether two given vertices are connected the ST-reliability problem. Both of these are #P-hard.

Number of connected graphs 

The number of distinct connected labeled graphs with n nodes is tabulated in the On-Line Encyclopedia of Integer Sequences as sequence .  The first few non-trivial terms are

Examples 
 The vertex- and edge-connectivities of a disconnected graph are both .
 -connectedness is equivalent to connectedness for graphs of at least 2 vertices.
Every other simple graph on  vertices has strictly smaller edge-connectivity.

Bounds on connectivity 
 The vertex-connectivity of a graph is less than or equal to its edge-connectivity. That is, . Both are less than or equal to the minimum degree of the graph, since deleting all neighbors of a vertex of minimum degree will disconnect that vertex from the rest of the graph.
 For a vertex-transitive graph of degree , we have: .
 For a vertex-transitive graph of degree , or for any (undirected) minimal Cayley graph of degree , or for any symmetric graph of degree , both kinds of connectivity are equal: .

Other properties 
 Connectedness is preserved by graph homomorphisms.
 If  is connected then its line graph  is also connected.
 A graph  is -edge-connected if and only if it has an orientation that is strongly connected.
 Balinski's theorem states that the polytopal graph (-skeleton) of a -dimensional convex polytope is a -vertex-connected graph.  Steinitz's previous theorem that any 3-vertex-connected planar graph is a polytopal graph (Steinitz theorem) gives a partial converse.
The converse is true when .

See also 
 Algebraic connectivity
 Cheeger constant (graph theory)
 Dynamic connectivity, Disjoint-set data structure
 Expander graph
 Strength of a graph

References